James Magruder (born 1960) is an American playwright, author, and translator. Magruder received his doctorate in dramaturgy and dramatic criticism at the Yale School of Drama. He is best known for his work on Broadway where he wrote the book for the musical Triumph of Love and adapted Jeff Whitty's original book for the Broadway mounting of the musical Head over Heels.

His translation, Three French Comedies (Yale University Press, 1996) was named an "Outstanding Literary Translation of the Year" by the American Literary Translators Association.

He has also published a short story collection, Let Me See It (2014), and two novels, Sugarless (2009) and Love Slaves of Helen Hadley Hall (2017). Sugarless was a Lambda Literary Award finalist and was shortlisted for the VCU Cabell First Novelists Award and the 2010 William Saroyan International Writing Prize.

He is a six-time recipient of the Maryland State Arts Council Individual Artist Award and a five-time fellow of the MacDowell Colony. He has taught at the Yale School of Drama and Swarthmore College.

Bibliography

References

External links
  James Magruder, Yale University

American writers
21st-century American novelists
21st-century American dramatists and playwrights
People from Baltimore
Yale School of Drama alumni
Cornell University alumni
Living people
1960 births